Sedat is a masculine Turkish given name. Notable people with the name include:

 Sedat (singer), German-Turkish singer
 Sedat Ağçay, Turkish footballer
 Sedat Alp, Turkish archaeologist
 Sedat Artuç, Turkish weightlifter
 Sedat Bayrak, Turkish footballer
 Sedat Bucak, Turkish chieftain and politician
 Sedat Laçiner, Turkish academic
 Sedat Peker, Turkish businessman
 Sedat Sir, Australian rules footballer
 Sedat Yeşilkaya, Turkish footballer

Turkish masculine given names